Van der Veen is a common Dutch surname, meaning "from the fen" or more generally "from the peatlands". In the Netherlands 19,847 people carried the name in 2007, making it the 32nd most common surname there. Dutch surnames with the same origin and meaning are Van Veen, Van de Ven/Van der Ven, Van de Venne, Veen, and Veenstra/Feenstra. The name was often taken by peat workers, as harvest of turf for fuel was abundant in the Netherlands. Since the early Middle Ages, the quarry of fens (laagveen, "low fen") in the north and west created, merged or extended many lakes, most of which have now been reclaimed as polders. The harvest of turf from bogs (hoogveen, "high fen") in the east, like the large Bourtange moor, extended until the 20th century.

Notable people with the surname include:

Van der Veen

 (born 1986), Dutch pop singer
Balthasar van der Veen (1596–1660), Dutch landscape painter
Dave van der Veen, Dutch mixed martial artist
 (born 1982), Dutch volleyball player
Eelke van der Veen (born 1946), Dutch politician
Fiel van der Veen (born 1945), Dutch illustrator
Frans van der Veen (1919–1975), Dutch footballer
Gerrit van der Veen (1902–1944), Dutch sculptor
 (1578–1659), Dutch poet
Jan van der Veen (born 1948), Dutch footballer
Jitse van der Veen (1928–1976), Dutch swimmer
Marten van der Veen (born 1946), British air marshal
Michael van der Veen (born 1963), American attorney
Paulus van der Veen (c. 1660 – 1733), Dutch governor of Suriname
Robert van der Veen (1906–1996), Dutch field hockey player
Wim van der Veen, Dutch bowling player

Van de Veen

Adriaen van de Veen (1589–1662), Dutch Golden Age painter

Vander Veen

Richard Vander Veen (1922–2006), Michigan state politician

See also
Van der Veen Ice Stream, ice stream in Antarctica named after the glaciologist Kees van der Veen (born 1956)

References

Dutch-language surnames
Surnames of Dutch origin